National Forensic Sciences University (NFSU), formerly Gujarat Forensic Science University (GFSU), is a Public university in Gandhinagar, Gujarat. It is solely dedicated to forensic and investigative science.

History 
The Gujarat Forensic Science University was formed by the Government of Gujarat in 2008. It was created by Act 17 passed in the Gujarat Legislative Assembly on 30 September 2008. It was upgraded to the National Forensic Sciences University in October 2020. It is recognised as an Institution of National Importance by the Act of Parliament.

Campus
It has 4 campuses across India.

See also
Central Forensic Science Laboratory
National Institute of Criminology & Forensic Science
 Institute of Forensic Science, Mumbai

References

External links 
 

Forensics organizations
Universities in Gujarat
Education in Gandhinagar
2008 establishments in Gujarat
Educational institutions established in 2008